The 2016–17 season was Doncaster Rovers's 138th season in their existence, 14th consecutive season in the Football League and first back in League Two following relegation last season. Along with League Two, the club also participated in the FA Cup, League Cup and League Trophy.

The season covered the period from 1 July 2016 to 30 June 2017.

Squad

Detailed Overview 
Caps and goals up to the start of season 2016–17. Players in bold left during the season.

Statistics 
This includes any players featured in a match day squad in any competition.

|}

Goals record
.

Disciplinary record
.

Transfers

Transfers in

Transfers out

Loans in

Loans out

Competitions

Pre–season friendlies

League Two

League table

Matches
Football League fixtures for the 2016–17 season were released on 22 June 2016.

FA Cup

Doncaster were drawn against Oldham Athletic of League One in the first round on 17 October 2016.

EFL Cup 
The first round of the EFL Cup for 2016–17 saw fixtures drawn on 22 June 2016. Rovers were drawn against Championship side Nottingham Forest.

EFL Trophy 
Following changes to the League Trophy, a group stage was introduced. Each group contains one Category One status academy and at least one team from each of League One and League Two, with the two highest placed teams qualifying for the next round. Doncaster were drawn in Northern Group E, alongside Derby County, Port Vale and Mansfield Town. Fixtures for the group stage were released on 27 July 2016.

Season summary

Detailed Summary 
Results on penalties are given as draws.

Awards 
 League Two Player of the Month (August): James Coppinger
 EFL Young Player of the Month (November): Liam Mandeville
 League Two Manager of the Month (January): Darren Ferguson
 League Two Player of the Season: John Marquis
Football Manager League Two Team of the Season:
 Manager: Darren Ferguson
 James Coppinger
 John Marquis
Football Manager EFL Team of the Season:
 Manager: Darren Ferguson
PFA Player in the Community: Andy Butler
 EFL Supporter of the Year: Paul Mayfield

References

Doncaster Rovers F.C. seasons
Doncaster Rovers